Agnesi is an Italian surname. Notable people with the surname include:

 Alberto Agnesi (born 1980), Mexican telenovela actor
 Luigi Agnesi (1833–1875), Belgian operatic bass-baritone, conductor and composer
 Maria Gaetana Agnesi (1718–1799), Italian linguist, mathematician and philosopher; sister of Maria Teresa
 Maria Teresa Agnesi Pinottini (1720–1795), Italian composer; sister of Maria Gaetana
 Nicolas Agnesi (born 1988), French rugby player
 Troilo Agnesi, 15th-century Roman Catholic prelate

See also
Witch of Agnesi, mathematical curve named after Maria Gaetana (also known as Agnesi witch)
16765 Agnesi, asteroid, named for Maria Gaetana
Agnesi (crater), on planet Venus, named for Maria Gaetana

Italian-language surnames